Leonard Carey (25 February 1887 – 11 September 1977) was an English character actor who very often played butlers in Hollywood films of the 1930s, 1940s and 1950s. He was also active in television during the 1950s. He is perhaps best known for his role as the beach hermit, Ben, in Alfred Hitchcock's Rebecca (1940).

One of his biggest roles was as "Dusty" in the film, Moon Over Her Shoulder (1941) with John Sutton. Other memorable appearances included roles in The Awful Truth (1937), Heaven Can Wait (1943), Hitchcock's Strangers on a Train (1951), Snows of Kilimanjaro (1952) and Thunder in the East (1953).

Carey retired from acting in the late 1950s. He died at aged 90 in Los Angeles. His interment was at Chapel of the Pines Crematory.

Selected filmography

Laughter (1930) - Benham, Gibson's Butler
Honor Among Lovers (1931) - Forbes, Butler
Once a Lady (1931) - Butler (uncredited)
Her Majesty, Love (1931) - Waiter (uncredited)
Nice Women (1931) - Connors, Butler
Working Girls (1931) - Boyd's Butler (uncredited)
Dr. Jekyll and Mr. Hyde (1931) - Briggs - Lanyon's Butler (uncredited)
This Reckless Age (1932) - Braithwaite (uncredited)
Shanghai Express (1932) - Carey (uncredited)
Merrily We Go to Hell (1932) - Prentice's Butler (uncredited)
Week Ends Only (1932) - Wilson, the Butler (uncredited)
Two Against the World (1932) - Club Waiter (uncredited)
The Crash (1932) - Fair's Butler (uncredited)
Call Her Savage (1932) - Jackson - Randall's Butler (uncredited)
A Lady's Profession (1933) - Albert - Garfield's Butler (uncredited)
King of the Jungle (1933) - Clerk at Hunting License Bureau (uncredited)
Infernal Machine (1933) - Hans (uncredited)
The Little Giant (1933) - Ingleby - the Cass' Butler (uncredited)
Looking Forward (1933) - Employee Talking to Miss Judd (uncredited)
Ann Carver's Profession (1933) - Melville - Butler (uncredited)
 The Avenger (1933) - Talbot
Bombshell (1933) - Winters
The Worst Woman in Paris? (1933) - Chumley - the Butler
Gambling Lady (1934) - Butler at Gambling Club (uncredited)
Double Door (1934) - William
Smarty (1934) - Tilford - Tony's Butler
The Loudspeaker (1934) - Finds Janet's address for Joe (uncredited)
His Greatest Gamble (1934) - Alfred
The Age of Innocence (1934) - The Butler
Outcast Lady (1934) - Martin - Passerby (uncredited)
I Sell Anything (1934) - Pertwee - Millicent's Chauffeur
The Little Minister (1934) - Hendry Munn
Hold 'Em Yale (1935) - Langdonn
Our Little Girl (1935) - Jackson
Ginger (1935) - Gwynne (uncredited)
Curly Top (1935) - Morgan's Secretary (uncredited)
Here's to Romance (1935) - Buttler (uncredited)
Two for Tonight (1935) - Mr. Myers' Butler (uncredited)
Ladies Love Danger (1935) - James, the Butler
The Bishop Misbehaves (1935) - Office Man (uncredited)
Metropolitan (1935) - Boris - Ghita's Butler (uncredited)
The Man Who Broke the Bank at Monte Carlo (1935) - Head Waiter (uncredited)
Strike Me Pink (1936) - Maitre d' at Club Lido (uncredited)
Rose Marie (1936) - Louis (uncredited)
The Milky Way (1936) - Mrs. Winthrop's Butler (uncredited)
Wife vs. Secretary (1936) - Taggart (uncredited)
The Unguarded Hour (1936) - Hilton - Alan's Assistant (uncredited)
Small Town Girl (1936) - Concierge (uncredited)
Trouble for Two (1936) - Valet (uncredited)
Little Miss Nobody (1936) - Butler (uncredited)
Bunker Bean (1936) - Kent's Butler
The Luckiest Girl in the World (1936) - Butler
15 Maiden Lane (1936) - Thomas Lockhart's Butler (uncredited)
A Woman Rebels (1936) - Lord Gaythorne's Butler (uncredited)
The Last of Mrs. Cheyney (1937) - Ames
Night of Mystery (1937) - Lister
The Emperor's Candlesticks (1937) - Valet to Wolensky (uncredited)
The Singing Marine (1937) - Darcy - Phinney's Valet (uncredited)
My Dear Miss Aldrich (1937) - William - Butler (uncredited)
Angel (1937) - Barker's Footman (uncredited)
Beg, Borrow or Steal (1937) - James, Lord Braemer's Butler (uncredited)
Hollywood Hotel (1937) - Dupre's Butler (uncredited)
Hitting a New High (1937) - Jervons, Blynn's Butler
Here's Flash Casey (1938) - Garden Party Waiter (uncredited)
Sally, Irene and Mary (1938) - Zorka's Butler (uncredited)
Hold That Kiss (1938) - Gibley - Piermont's Butler (uncredited)
Blond Cheat (1938) - Meggs - the Trent Butler (uncredited)
Bulldog Drummond in Africa (1938) - Phillips (uncredited)
The Little Adventuress (1938) - Butler (uncredited)
The Lone Wolf Spy Hunt (1939) - Jameson
Beauty for the Asking (1939) - Peters (uncredited)
Fast and Loose (1939) - Craddock
The Hound of the Baskervilles (1939) - Hugo's Servant (uncredited)
The Zero Hour (1939) - Butler
Stronger Than Desire (1939) - Albert - Flagg's Butler (uncredited)
Five Little Peppers and How They Grew (1939) - Martin
Raffles (1939) - Bingham's Secretary (uncredited)
Parole Fixer (1940) - Craden's Butler (uncredited)
Rebecca (1940) - Ben
In Old Missouri (1940) - Haskins
Private Affairs (1940) - Casper, the Butler
Sing, Dance, Plenty Hot (1940) - Henderson
Hired Wife (1940) - Peterson - Butler (uncredited)
Sky Murder (1940) - Sutter - Grand's Butler (uncredited)
A Dispatch from Reuters (1940) - Delane's Secretary (uncredited)
Nice Girl? (1941) - Upton - Calvert's Butler (uncredited)
Rage in Heaven (1941) - Eric - Chauffeur (uncredited)
That Hamilton Woman (1941) - Orderly (uncredited)
West Point Widow (1941) - Simpson (uncredited)
Accent on Love (1941) - Flowers
Mountain Moonlight (1941) - Briggs
Private Nurse (1941) - Smitty
We Go Fast (1941) - Hempstead's Butler (uncredited)
Moon Over Her Shoulder (1941) - Mate Dusty Rhodes
Suspicion (1941) - Burton - McLaidlaws' Butler (uncredited)
Confirm or Deny (1941) - Sidney
Tuxedo Junction (1941) - Jenkins
Son of Fury: The Story of Benjamin Blake (1942) - Pale Tom (uncredited)
What's Cookin'? (1942) - Butler (uncredited)
Yokel Boy (1942) - Monroe the Butler (uncredited)
This Above All (1942) - Policeman with Rector (uncredited)
Mrs. Miniver (1942) - Chandler - Lady Beldon's Butler (uncredited)
The Affairs of Martha (1942) - The Butler (uncredited)
I Married an Angel (1942) - Servant (uncredited)
Give Out, Sisters (1942) - Jamison - The Waverly Butler
Nightmare (1942) - Parker - Stafford's Servant (uncredited)
The Youngest Profession (1943) - Walter Pidgeon's Valet (uncredited)
Heaven Can Wait (1943) - Flogdell - Van Cleve's First Butler (uncredited)
Gaslight (1944) - Guide (uncredited)
Once Upon a Time (1944) - English Bobby (uncredited)
The Invisible Man's Revenge (1944) - The Police Constable (uncredited)
Secrets of Scotland Yard (1944) - Butler (uncredited)
Babes on Swing Street (1944) - William (uncredited)
Sweet and Low-Down (1944) - The Wilsons' Butler (uncredited)
National Velvet (1944) - Pressman (uncredited)
Ministry of Fear (1944) - Porter (uncredited)
Penthouse Rhythm (1945) - The Butler (uncredited)
Tomorrow Is Forever (1946) - Hamilton Employee (uncredited)
Moss Rose (1947) - Coroner (uncredited)
Unconquered (1947) - Jeremiah Dixon - London Astronomer
This Time for Keeps (1947) - Butler (uncredited)
The Exile (1947) - Cavalier (uncredited)
Forever Amber (1947) - Dead Caller (uncredited)
The Paradine Case (1947) - Courtroom Stenographer (uncredited)
If Winter Comes (1947) - Official with Summons (uncredited)
Slightly French (1949) - Wilson (uncredited)
Adventure in Baltimore (1949) - Vestryman (uncredited)
The Secret Garden (1949) - Charles, the Butler (uncredited)
Challenge to Lassie (1949) - Patron of Dining Room (uncredited)
That Forsyte Woman (1949) - Jones - Old Jolyon's Butler (uncredited)
Please Believe Me (1950) - Ship's Captain (uncredited)
Kind Lady (1951) - Postman
Strangers on a Train (1951) - Anthonys' Butler (uncredited)
Dick Turpin's Ride (1951) - Jailer (uncredited)
Thunder in the East (1951) - Dr. Paling
Washington Story (1952) - Chef (uncredited)
Les Misérables (1952) - Citizen (uncredited)
The Snows of Kilimanjaro (1952) - Dr. Simmons (uncredited)
The King's Thief (1955) - Servant (uncredited)
While the City Sleeps (1956) - Steven - Walter's Butler (uncredited)

References

External links
 
 

1887 births
1977 deaths
English male film actors
English male television actors
20th-century English male actors
English expatriates in the United States
Male actors from London
British expatriate male actors in the United States